Breece is an unincorporated community and coal town in Boone County, West Virginia, United States. Their post office, known as Laville  has closed. They were also known as Laville, Mistletoe and Layville.

References 

Unincorporated communities in West Virginia
Coal towns in West Virginia
Unincorporated communities in Boone County, West Virginia